The Silvertown by-election of 1940 was a wartime by-election.

Silvertown was a safe Labour seat, and none of the major parties stood against the Labour candidate.

It was one of the last by-elections contested by the British Union of Fascists which campaigned on a platform calling for an immediate peace with Nazi Germany, a policy which won them only 151 votes.

References

Silvertown,1940
Silvertown,1940
Silvertown by-election
Silvertown by-election
Silvertown,1940
1940s in Essex